The 2008–09 FIBA EuroChallenge was the sixth edition of Europe's third-tier level transnational men's professional club basketball FIBA EuroChallenge Tournament, and the first under the FIBA EuroChallenge name, organized by FIBA Europe. A total number of 32 teams participated in the regular season and a total of 40 teams competed including the qualifying rounds. Virtus Bologna won its first EuroChallenge title after defeating Cholet in the Final of the Final Four, which was hosted in Bologna.

Format
In all there are 40 teams from 21 countries, plus sixteen teams from the 2008–09 Eurocup Basketball first preliminary round and second preliminary round. The competition is jointly run by FIBA Europe.

Teams 
The labels in the parentheses show how each team qualified for the place of its starting round (TH: title holders;):

 1st, 2nd, 3rd, 4th, 5th, etc.: League position after eventual Playoffs
 EC: Transferred from Eurocup

QR: Losers from qualifying rounds

 WC: Wild card

Qualifying rounds
Thirty-two teams will participate in the first round and sixteen in the second.

First qualifying round

|}

Second qualifying round

|}

Regular season

Group A

Group B

Group C

Group D

Group E

*Due to the war situation in Gaza Strip, Olympia refused to travel to Israel and Hapoel Jerusalim were declared winners by forfeit (20-0)

Group F

Group G

Group H

Top 16

Group I

Group J

Group K

Group L

Quarterfinals

Final Four

The Final Four will be the last stage of EuroChallenge 2008–09. The event will take place at the Futurshow Station, in Bologna.

See also
 2008–09 Eurocup Basketball
 2008–09 Euroleague

External links
FIBA Europe
European Basketball website

 
2008
Euro